Loup Loup Pass (el. 4020 ft./1225 m.) is a mountain pass in the Cascades in the state of Washington.

It is located east of the Methow Valley of Okanogan County, between the towns of Twisp and Okanogan on State Route 20. A small ski area is located at the pass.

External links 
 Loup Loup Pass road conditions

Mountain passes of Washington (state)
Transportation in Okanogan County, Washington
Mountain passes of Okanogan County, Washington